Sarah Defrise is a Belgian soprano born in Brussels, Belgium.

Biography

Youth and education 
Sarah Defrise is the daughter of two scientists and grew up in Watermael-Boitsfort in Brussels. She studied French literature at the Université libre de Bruxelles before joining the Royal Conservatory of Brussels (Dutch section) where she earned a Master of Music. She then went to study with Daniel Ottevaere at the École normale de musique de Paris where she earned a concertist diploma. In 2020, she earned a PhD in defending a these on melodies by Joseph Jongen at the Vrije Universiteit Brussel.

Career 
Defrise made her debut in the role of Clorinda in La Cenerentola by Gioachino Rossini at the Opéra Royal de Wallonie in Liège in 2014. In 2017, she was designated young revelation at the Festival van Vlaanderen in Ghent and sang in duo with José Van Dam and the Symfonieorkest Vlaanderen under the direction of Jan Latham-Koenig. Her career developed in the direction of contemporary music and the premier roles in stage works by Peter Eötvös, Jean-Luc Fafchamps and Denis Bosse. In 2021, she sang Aventures et Nouvelles Aventures by György Ligeti for György Kurtág 95th birthday at the Budapest Music Center. She has sung on stages such as the Opéra Royal de Wallonie, Théâtre Royal de la Monnaie, Grand Théâtre de Genève, Staatsoper Unter den Linden, Nouvel opéra Fribourg, Opéra national de Lorraine, Théâtre de l'Athénée Louis-Jouvet, Müpa Budapest and Teatro Real in Madrid.

Competitions and Prizes
 2022 : 2021 Young Musician of the Year, Prix Caecilia
 2018 : Best performer Prize at International opera competition Armel in Budapest
 2016 : Grand Prix musique contemporaine at Concours international Enesco in Paris
 2013 : Bourse Nany Philippart
 2012 : Prix jeune espoir féminin at Concours international de chant lyrique de Vivonne

Principal roles 
 2023 : Arabella by Richard Strauss, Christof Loy (stage direction) - Zdenka at Teatro Real in Madrid
 2022 : Don Giovanni by Wolfgang Amadeus Mozart - Zerlina at Opéra Royal de Wallonie
 2022 : Is This The End #2 by Jean-Luc Fafchamps – The Girl, premiered at Théâtre Royal de la Monnaie
 2022 : Der goldene Drache by Peter Eötvös - Young woman / The little Chinese at Grand Théâtre de Genève
 2021 : Sleepless by Peter Eötvös – The Girl, premiered at Staatsoper Unter den Linden in Berlin
 2021 : Pelléas et Mélisande by Claude Debussy - Mélisande at Nouvel opéra Fribourg
 2020 : Is This The End by Jean-Luc Fafchamps - The Girl, premiered at Théâtre Royal de la Monnaie
 2019 : La Cenerentola by Gioachino Rossini - Clorinda at Opéra Royal de Wallonie
 2019 : Candide by Leonard Bernstein - Cunégonde at Opéra Royal de Wallonie
 2018 : Calamity Jane by Ben Johnston - Calamity Jane at Armel Festival in Budapest

Discography 
 2021 : For Cathy, A Capella Album, A Tribute to Cathy Berberian with pieces by Cathy Berberian, Luciano Berio, Sylvano Bussotti, John Cage, Sarah Defrise and Henri Pousseur for Sub Rosa
 2019 : Entrevisions, volume 1 of the complete melodies by Joseph Jongen with pianist Craig White for Musique en Wallonie
 2019 : Un Requiem de Thierry Huillet

Videos 
 Sequenza III by Luciano Berio and Stripsody by Cathy Berberian for Festival de Wallonie
 Coding Zero excerpt of Grand Macabre by György Ligeti with Stephane Ginsburgh, filmed by Patrick Leterme for Musiq'3

References

External links 
 Official website

Year of birth missing (living people)
Living people
Belgian operatic sopranos
21st-century Belgian women opera singers
Royal Conservatory of Brussels alumni
Université libre de Bruxelles alumni
Musicians from Brussels